William Henry King (June 3, 1863November 27, 1949) was an American lawyer, politician, and jurist from Salt Lake City, Utah. As a Democrat, King represented Utah in the United States Senate from 1917 until 1941.

Life
King was born in Fillmore, Utah Territory to Josephine (née Henry) and William King. He graduated from Brigham Young Academy in Provo, Utah and attended the University of Deseret (now University of Utah) in Salt Lake City. He served as a missionary of the Church of Jesus Christ of Latter-day Saints in Great Britain from 1880 to 1883.

After holding local offices and serving two terms in the territorial legislature, he graduated from the law department of the University of Michigan at Ann Arbor. He later joined the Utah bar and practiced law. He held other territorial offices and was appointed as an associate justice of the Utah Supreme Court, serving between 1894 and 1896.

After Utah became a state in 1896, King was elected to the United States House of Representatives and served in the 55th Congress from March 4, 1897 to March 3, 1899. He was not nominated for a second term, but when his replacement, B. H. Roberts, was denied his seat because he was a polygamist, King was elected to complete Roberts's term. He served from April 2, 1900 to March 3, 1901. He ran for the same position in 1900 and again in 1902, but lost both times.

King was elected to the United States Senate four times, serving between March 4, 1917 and January 3, 1941. In 1918 and 1919, he served on the Overman Committee, which investigated seditious pro-German activity during World War I and Bolshevik-inspired anti-Americanism in the months following the war's end. 

Though a Democrat, King was somewhat independent of the popular Democratic president Franklin Delano Roosevelt; he was re-elected in 1934 on the strength of support for Roosevelt's New Deal, but he opposed the proposal to expand the Supreme Court as well as FDR's candidacy for an unprecedented third presidential term. When he ran for re-election in 1940, he lost the Democratic nomination to Congressman Abe Murdock, a "100% New Dealer" who strongly supported Roosevelt.

He served as the President pro tempore of the Senate from 1940-41 during the 76th Congress.

King remained in Washington, D.C., where he practiced law until April 1947. He returned to Utah and died there in 1949. He was buried at Salt Lake City Cemetery.

King was married twice, first to Louisa Ann "Annie" Lyman, to whom he wed in 1889, and remained with her to her death on April 16, 1906. He was then married to Vera B. Sjodahl, a daughter of Janne M. Sjödahl, from 1912 to his own death in 1949. One of his sons by Vera, David S. King, served three terms in the U.S. House of Representatives and was a United States Ambassador to both the Malagasy Republic and Mauritius. One of his granddaughters, Jody Olsen, has served as Director of the Peace Corps since 2018. His paternal first cousin, Culbert Olson, was a Governor of California.

King was a direct descendant of Edmund Rice, his family's English immigrant ancestor to Massachusetts Bay Colony, as follows:

 William H. King, son of
 William King (1834–1892), son of
 Thomas Rice King (1813–1879), son of
 Thomas King (1770–1845), son of
 William King (1724–1793), son of
 Ezra Rice King (1697–1746), son of
 Samuel Rice King (1667–1713), son of
 Samuel Rice (1634–1684), son of
 Edmund Rice (1594–1663)

See also
 List of United States senators from Utah

References

External links

William Henry and David S. King papers, MSS 6143 at the L. Tom Perry Special Collections, Harold B. Lee Library, Brigham Young University
J. Kubeldzis scrapbooks on William Henry King at the L. Tom Perry Special Collections, Harold B. Lee Library, Brigham Young University

|-

|-

|-

|-

|-

|-

|-

1863 births
1949 deaths
People from Fillmore, Utah
American people of English descent
Latter Day Saints from Utah
Democratic Party members of the United States House of Representatives from Utah
Democratic Party United States senators from Utah
Presidents pro tempore of the United States Senate
Utah Territorial judges
Justices of the Utah Supreme Court
19th-century American politicians
19th-century Mormon missionaries
20th-century American politicians
American Mormon missionaries in England
Politicians from Salt Lake City
Brigham Young University alumni
University of Utah alumni
University of Michigan Law School alumni
Burials at Salt Lake City Cemetery